João Carlos da Silva Costa, best known as João Carlos (born 15 January 1956) is a Brazilian football manager.

Managerial statistics

Honors
J. League Manager of the Year – 1997

References

External links
 Site official

1956 births
Living people
Brazilian football managers
Expatriate football managers in Japan
Expatriate football managers in Saudi Arabia
Expatriate soccer managers in South Africa
J1 League managers
J2 League managers
Campeonato Brasileiro Série A managers
Al Hilal SFC managers
América Futebol Clube (SP) managers
Kashima Antlers managers
Club Athletico Paranaense managers
União São João Esporte Clube managers
Brazil national under-20 football team managers
Nagoya Grampus managers
Cerezo Osaka managers
CR Flamengo managers
Hokkaido Consadole Sapporo managers
Tupi Football Club managers
Clube de Regatas Brasil managers
Esporte Clube Tigres do Brasil managers
Orlando Pirates F.C. managers
Al-Ta'ee managers
Saudi Professional League managers
Brazilian expatriate sportspeople in Saudi Arabia